Leipon, or Pityilu, is an Austronesian language spoken on Hauwai, Ndrilo, and Pityilu islands, just off Manus Island in Papua New Guinea.

References

External links 
 Kaipuleohone's Robert Blust collection includes written materials from Leipon

Manus languages
Languages of Manus Province